Michael Francis Lynch  (born 1950) is an Australian arts administrator.

Biography
Lynch was General Manager of the Sydney Theatre Company 1989–94. He was then General Manager of the Australia Council, the Federal Government's arts funding and advisory body, 1994–98.  In 1998 he became director of the Sydney Opera House, and from 2002 to 2009 he was chief executive of the South Bank Centre in London.

Lynch has overseen the successful rehabilitation of the Royal Festival Hall, which was re-opened in October 2007 by The Queen (King George VI having opened the original building in 1951).

In March 2009, Lynch was appointed a director of the Australian Broadcasting Corporation. He is also a member of the Board of Film Victoria.

On 27 May 2011, Lynch was appointed as CEO of West Kowloon Cultural District Authority by the Hong Kong Government.

Honours
Lynch was appointed a Member of the Order of Australia (AM) in the Queen's Birthday Honours List of 2001 for services to arts administration (principally as General Manager of the Australia Council) and in 2008 he was appointed Commander of the Order of the British Empire (CBE) in the Birthday Honours. In the Queen's Birthday Honours List of 2017, Lynch was appointed an Officer of the Order of Australia (AO).

References

Australian arts administrators
Arts managers
Culture in London
Living people
Commanders of the Order of the British Empire
Officers of the Order of Australia
Australian expatriates in Hong Kong
1950 births
Helpmann Award winners